Rockstar Games, Inc. is an American video game publisher based in New York City. The company was established in December 1998 as a subsidiary of Take-Two Interactive, using the assets Take-Two had previously acquired from BMG Interactive. Founding members of the company were Terry Donovan, Gary Foreman, Dan and Sam Houser, and Jamie King, who worked for Take-Two at the time, and of which the Houser brothers were previously executives at BMG Interactive. Sam Houser heads the studio as president.

Since 1999, several companies acquired by or established under Take-Two have become part of Rockstar Games, such as Rockstar Canada (later renamed Rockstar Toronto) becoming the first one in 1999, and Rockstar Dundee the most recent in 2020. All companies organized under Rockstar Games bear the "Rockstar" name and logo. In this context, Rockstar Games is sometimes also referred to as Rockstar New York, Rockstar NY or Rockstar NYC. Rockstar Games also sports a motion capture studio in Bethpage, New York.

Rockstar Games predominantly publishes games in the action-adventure genre, while racing games also saw success for the company. One of such action-adventure game franchises is Grand Theft Auto, which Rockstar Games took over from BMG Interactive, which published the series' original 1997 entry. The most recent main game in the series, Grand Theft Auto V, has sold over 170 million copies since its release in September 2013, making it the second-best-selling video game of all time. Other popular franchises published by Rockstar Games are Red Dead, Midnight Club, Max Payne, and Manhunt.

History 

On March 12, 1998, Take-Two Interactive announced its acquisition of the assets of dormant British video game publisher BMG Interactive from BMG Entertainment (a unit of Bertelsmann). In exchange, Take-Two was to issue 1.85 million shares (around 16%) of its common stock to BMG Entertainment. Through this acquisition, Take-Two obtained several of BMG Interactive's former intellectual properties, including DMA Design's Grand Theft Auto and Space Station Silicon Valley. The deal was announced to have closed on March 25. Three BMG Interactive executives—Dan Houser, Sam Houser, and Jamie King—as well as Gary Foreman of BMG Interactive and Terry Donovan of BMG Entertainment's Arista Records record label, subsequently moved to New York City to work for Take-Two Interactive. In a restructuring announced that April, Sam Houser was appointed as Take-Two's "vice president of worldwide product development". In December 1998, the Houser brothers, Donovan and King established Rockstar Games as the "high-end" publishing label of Take-Two. The formation was formally announced on January 22, 1999.

In January 2007, Take-Two announced that Donovan, until then managing director for Rockstar Games, had left the company following a four-month leave of absence. He was succeeded by Gary Dale, who became chief operating officer. Dale previously worked with the Houser brothers and King at BMG Interactive, but left the company when it was acquired by Take-Two Interactive, and joined Capcom's European operations as managing director in 2003.

As of February 2014, Rockstar Games titles have shipped more than 250 million copies, the largest franchise being the Grand Theft Auto series, which alone has shipments of at least 250 million as of November 2016. Grand Theft Auto V shipped the highest number of units within the series' and the company's history, with over 170 million copies, making it the second best-selling video game of all time.

At the 10th British Academy Games Awards in March 2014, Rockstar Games was honored with the BAFTA Academy Fellowship Award for "creating intricately layered interactive worlds that have kept the company at the forefront of the gaming industry for over a decade, both critically and commercially". Jennifer Kolbe, who started at the front desk of Take-Two, acts as Rockstar Games' head of publishing and oversees all development studios. Simon Ramsey is the company's head of PR and communications.

In September 2019, Rockstar Games announced that they had released their own game launcher, a digital distribution, digital rights management, multiplayer and communications service. After having taken an extended break following the release of Red Dead Redemption 2 in early 2019, Dan Houser left Rockstar Games on March 11, 2020.

The company acquired the Scottish studio Ruffian Games in October 2020, rebranding the studio as Rockstar Dundee.

In September 2022, Rockstar was the target of a data breach in which 90 videos from the development of the upcoming Grand Theft Auto game were leaked. Rockstar described the leak as a "network intrusion", and noted that it was "extremely disappointed" by the manner in which the game was first demonstrated, but that it did not anticipate long-term effects on development.

Company philosophy 
In October 2011, Dan Houser told Famitsu that Rockstar Games was intentionally avoiding developing games in the first-person shooter genre, because "it is in our DNA to avoid doing what other companies are doing ... the goalpoint of Rockstar is to have the players really feel what we're trying to do." Houser went on to say "Our games up to now have been different from any genre that existed at the time; we made new genres by ourselves with games like the GTA series. We didn't rely on testimonials in a business textbook to do what we've done. ... If we make the sort of games we want to play, then we believe people are going to buy them."

The company has been involved with charitable work ranging from supporting Movember and offering appearances in games as a raffle prize, to charity live streams.

Games

Other projects

Rockstar Loft 
In 1999, Donovan and Sam Houser cooperated with John Davis to establish the Rockstar Loft club night. Davis had co-founded and been the promoter for Body & Soul, a "no-guestlist, no velvet rope party" held weekly at Tribeca's Club Vinyl. When Rockstar Games' founder originally arrived in New York City, former DJ Donovan was particularly impressed with Body & Soul, and they became close with the club night's team, including Davis and its other founder, DJ François K. Davis had sought to establish further such events, while Donovan and Houser wanted to get publicity for the young Rockstar Games, thus they established Rockstar Loft. According to Donovan, the event was to serve as an alternative those that were overly expensive or had attendees "bulldozed by security". He precluded video game installations at the venue to focus on the music and highlight the artists.

As it could not afford frequent television advertisements, Rockstar Games resorted to guerrilla marketing teams distributing fly posters and stickers. Tickets for Rockstar Loft were not sold in advance. Instead, potential guests were to call a phone number and face seven questions regarding their personality. If answered to the liking of the operator, the caller would receive their entry ticket in the mail. The first Rockstar Loft was held in western Chelsea, Manhattan, on October 30, 1999, with Andi Hanley (a regular of Body & Soul), Bob Sinclar, and Dimitri from Paris as headlining DJs. Thereafter, it was held "every few months", with one happening on February 19, 2000. Later that year, Rockstar Loft was wound down.

Films 
Kirk Ewing—a friend of the Houser brothers who had worked with Rockstar Games on State of Emergency—stated that, around the release of Grand Theft Auto III in 2001, Rockstar Games had been offered  for a film based on the Grand Theft Auto franchise. He had received a phone call from a producer in Los Angeles requesting the rights for a film to be directed by Tony Scott of Top Gun and starring rapper Eminem. When he relayed this proposal to Sam Houser, Houser said that he was not interested. In 2004, Rockstar Games produced the sports drama film The Football Factory. Based on the book of the same name by John King, the film revolves around organized football hooliganism in the United Kingdom. The company also produced Sunday Driver, a documentary about the Majestics Lowrider Club in Compton, California, and The Introduction, an animated film that details the events leading up to Grand Theft Auto: San Andreas. Both were bundled with the game's special edition released in 2005.

CircoLoco Records 
In May 2021, Rockstar Games launched the record label CircoLoco Records in collaboration with Circoloco, an Ibiza-based dance party. The collaboration grew from a friendship between Sam Houser and Circoloco's promoter, Antonio Carbonaro. According to Nick Benedetti, the party's manager, Rockstar Games and Circoloco intended to "contribute something new and meaningful" to the dance music scene, which had faced hardships because of the lockdowns brought on by the COVID-19 pandemic. CircoLoco Records' first release, Monday Dreamin, was released as a series of extended plays starting in June 2021.

 Studios 
Outside of its New York City headquarters, Rockstar Games operates nine subsidiary studios. All studios use the Rockstar Games logo with individual colors. As of 2018, the company employs more than 2,000 people across all offices. The studios frequently collaborate and are sometimes collectively credited as Rockstar Studios''', as is the case in Max Payne 3 and Red Dead Redemption 2''.

Former

Software

RAGE 

Rockstar Advanced Game Engine (RAGE) is a game engine developed by the Rockstar San Diego-internal RAGE Technology Group, created to facilitate game development on all platforms since 2006.

Rockstar Games Social Club 
Rockstar Games Social Club is an online gaming service created by Rockstar Games for authentication and multiplayer applications within their games.

Rockstar Games Launcher 
Rockstar Games released its own games launcher for Windows on September 17, 2019. The launcher integrates with the user's Social Club account, allowing them to download and buy games that they have previously purchased through Rockstar's store, as well as launch Rockstar games available from other services, like Steam, from the launcher.

References

External links 
 

 
1998 establishments in New York City
BAFTA fellows
Software companies based in New York City
Take-Two Interactive divisions and subsidiaries
Video game companies established in 1998
Video game companies of the United States
Video game development companies
Video game publishers
Video game publishing brands